A spicy tuna roll is a makizushi roll that usually contains raw tuna, and spicy mayo or sriracha. The roll is often seasoned with Ichimi togarashi (ground red chile powder). The roll was invented in Seattle, Washington in the 1980s and is one of the more popular sushi rolls in the United States.

History 
The spicy tuna roll was invented in Seattle during the 1980s by Jean Nakayama of Maneki restaurant. She invented it by mixing tuna scraps with chilli sauce and rolling that into sushi with sheets of nori and sushi rice. It is similar to negitoro, a kind of raw tuna filling made with scrapings from bones and other parts of the tuna with very little meat. The main difference between negitoro and spicy tuna roll filling is that negitoro includes scallions and is not spicy. The dish has subsequently become very popular in the United States.

References 

Food and drink in California
Tuna dishes
Sushi in the United States